Florence Kate Upton (22 February 1873 – 16 October 1922) was an American-born English cartoonist and author most famous for creating the Golliwog character, featured in a series of children's books.

Early life
Upton was born in Flushing, New York, to British parents who had immigrated recently. She was the second of four children in a creative and slightly eccentric household.

Florence's father, Thomas Harborough Upton, worked as a confidential clerk at the American Exchange Bank in New York. In 1884, the family moved from Flushing to central Manhattan, which was more convenient for her father's daily journey to his office. The National Academy of Design, located near the new home, offered free instruction to anyone who could qualify. This prompted her father to enroll in evening classes, and Florence, at 15 years old, joined him for the beginning of her formal art training.

Early career
In June 1889, the family was placed in financial difficulty by the sudden death of Thomas Upton. Florence's mother, Bertha, had a trained singing voice and began to give voice lessons in the home. Her older sister Ethelwyn found work, while her younger siblings Alice and Desmond remained in school. Florence, at age 16, obtained work as a professional illustrator. Numerous publications existed at this time, mainly as vehicles for advertising and light fiction of varying merit. Some of the same authors whose stories appeared in the magazines went on to employ Florence to illustrate their novels or books of short stories.

Finances eventually stabilised to such a degree that in 1893, the family was able to pay an extended visit to Bertha's relatives, the Hudsons, who lived in the Hampstead area of London. With an established reputation from her published work in New York, Florence had no difficulty in finding employment with London publishers. When the rest of the family returned to the United States, she opted to stay in England and began experimenting with ideas to supplement her income so that she could afford further art training.

Golliwogg

Upton began to sketch out ideas for a children's book, using "penny wooden" dolls as her models. However, without a central character on which to hang the tale, progress came to a standstill. Her aunt, Kate Hudson, found a blackface minstrel toy in her attic that had belonged to the Upton children, left behind from an earlier visit. This toy, which she named "Golliwogg", provided inspiration, and the first story was completed in 1894. After the manuscript was rejected by several publishing houses, John William Allen of Longmans, Green & Co. took it home and read it to his children. Their enthusiastic response prompted Allen to advocate for its publication, and Longmans offered Upton a contract. The Adventures of Two Dutch Dolls and a "Golliwogg" was published for Christmas 1895.

During her stay in London, Upton provided illustrations for The Strand Magazine, The Idler and Punch. The American Society in London also commissioned a series of drawings and cartoons to decorate the souvenir programme of their November 1896 Thanksgiving Banquet. In 1895 she studied art at Croydon under Walter Wallis. She gave him a copy of her book, which was later given to his grandchildren: its present whereabouts are unknown. After three years of work, she returned to New York to attend the Art Students League, then continued studies in Paris and the Netherlands. Returning to London in 1906 to take up permanent residence, she moved to 21 Great College Street in 1910.

Through the years Florence and Bertha collaborated on thirteen Golliwogg adventures, beginning with The Adventures of two Dutch Dolls and a "Golliwogg", in which the text was credited to Bertha. Over the years, public interest in the series waned, and Florence focused on her career as a professional artist. The last of the books was published in 1909.

Upton continued to study and paint, concentrating mainly on portraits. She exhibited at the Royal Academy and other prominent venues and rapidly established a reputation as an accomplished society portraitist. Additionally, she received hundreds of commissions from the families of young soldiers.

For health reasons, Upton was found unfit to serve in any physical capacity during the First World War. Instead she aided the war effort by donating her original dolls and drawings to a fund-raising auction for the Red Cross, conducted by Christie's in 1917. The sale of the dolls, which as a lot fetched 450 guineas, funded the purchase of an ambulance: it was christened "Golliwogg", and served at the front in France.

Death
At the age of 49, Upton died in her studio on 16 October 1922, from complications following surgery. She is buried in Hampstead Cemetery.

Legacy
The original Golliwogg and Dutch Dolls resided for many years at Chequers, the Prime Minister's country estate in Buckinghamshire. They are now at the V&A Museum of Childhood in Bethnal Green, London.

The Golliwogg had a considerable impact at the height of its popularity. Florence Upton's friend and biographer Edith Lyttelton recollected, "One of my children, long before we knew who Bertha and Florence Upton were, had a passionate attachment to the doll stories, and a new Golliwogg book was a great excitement in my nursery as in countless others."

Upton did not patent the character. Recognising a large and profitable market, many toy companies took advantage of the popularity of the books and manufactured versions of the doll, while other writers and illustrators took equal advantage, many changing the nature of the series. In 1910, John Robertson, of the jam manufacturing family James Robertson & Sons, decided it should be the company's mascot, which it remained until 2002.

The prolific Enid Blyton chose to depict golliwogs in a number of her stories as naughty individuals. Other authors took a similar tack. The name "golliwog" came to be used as a degrading term for anyone who was not white-skinned, and new origins were suggested for the word. Upton despaired: "I am frightened when I read the fearsome etymology some deep, dark minds can see in his name."

References

External links

 
 
Works by Bertha Upton and Florence Kate Upton at Toronto Public Library
 "Golliwogg.co.uk" An independent guide to Golliwogs and the work of Florence K Upton
 
 

1873 births
1922 deaths
19th-century American women writers
20th-century American women writers
19th-century English women writers
20th-century English women writers
20th-century English writers
American women cartoonists
British women cartoonists
English cartoonists
English children's writers
American people of English descent
Alumni of Croydon College
Art Students League of New York alumni
Burials at Hampstead Cemetery
American women children's writers
American children's writers
American emigrants to England
People from Flushing, Queens
People from Hampstead
American cartoonists